P. V. Jagadish Kumar (born 12 June 1955) known mononymously as Jagadish, is an Indian actor, screenwriter, television presenter and former politician. He has starred in over 375 Malayalam films and 2 Hindi films. He is best known for his comic and character roles. Jagadish starred in over 50 films as the lead actor during the 1990s. He was one of the bankable lead stars in Malayalam cinema during the 1990s, along with Mukesh, Siddique, Sreenivasan and Jayaram.

Jagadish made his acting debut with My Dear Kuttichathan (1984), India's first 3D film. He got a big break with his role as Appukuttan in Siddique-Lal's In Harihar Nagar (1990). His notable films include Godfather (1991), Mimics Parade (1991), Welcome to Kodaikanal (1992), Thiruthalvaadi (1992), Priyapetta Kukku (1992), Mr & Mrs (1992), Pandu Pandoru Rajakumari (1992), Kunukkitta Kozhi (1992), Kasarkode Khaderbai (1992), Kallan Kappalil Thanne (1992), Grihaprevesam (1992), Sthreedhanam (1993), Sthalathe Pradhana Payyans (1993), Injakkadan Mathai & Sons (1993), Simhavalan Menon (1995), Mimics Super 1000 (1996),  Hitler (1996),Junior Mandrake(1997),Gramapanchayath (film) (1998). He has written a few scripts as well, most notably Adhipan (1989).

Jagadish is a postgraduate M.Com. rank-holder. He transitioned from a bank officer to a government-aided college lecturer and to an actor within a short time. In 2016, Jagadish entered into politics using his star value to compete against his colleague and former state minister K. B. Ganesh Kumar for Member of the Legislative Assembly post of the Pathanapuram constituency under the banner of the Indian National Congress and lost in the elections.

Early life
Jagadish was born as the fifth son among six children to K. Parameshwaran Nair and P. Bhasurangi Amma on 21 June 1955 in present-day Chenkal, Neyyattinkara, Thiruvananthapuram, Kerala, India. His father was a school headmaster and his mother was a housewife. He has two elder brothers, Dr. Gopakumar and Rajkumar; a younger brother, Sureshkumar; and two elder sisters, Late Dr.P.B.Santha Devi and Chandrika Devi. He had his primary education from Government Model Boys Higher Secondary School, Thiruvananthapuram. He earned a bachelor's in commerce from Government Arts College, Thiruvananthapuram. Jagadish post-graduated with a Master of Commerce from Mar Ivanios College, Nalanchira, Trivandrum under the University of Kerala with first rank. He worked as a Clerk in Canara Bank, Edappal, Kerala. Later he became a lecturer and NCC officer in M.G. College, Thiruvananthapuram, a college run by NSS. He had also worked as lecturer in 
Pazhassi Raja N. S. S. College, Mattanur ,Kannur. He had dreams of becoming a film actor, so he took a long leave from his job and tried his luck in films.

Personal life
Jagadish was married to P. Rema, a forensic professor in the Medical College, Thiruvananthapuram, who died on 1 April 2022. The couple has two daughters, both are doctors, now married and having their own children. They are settled at Kaladi, Karamana, Thiruvananthapuram.

Film career
Jagadish started his film career as a cinematographer with the 1978 film Ahalya. He dubbed for various other actors, normally for short dialogues. As an actor, he debuted with a minor role as a cabaret announcer in My Dear Kuttichathan (1984), which was India's first 3-D film. Jagadish became an established actor with his roles in Mutharamkunnu P.O. (1985), where he plays the hero's friend, Nandi Veendum Varika (1986), Manivathoorile Aayiram Sivarathrikal (1987) and Vandanam (1989). In his early career, he wrote stories and screenplays for a few films including Mazha Peyyunnu Maddalam Kottunnu (1986) (story), Manivathoorile Aayiram Sivarathrikal (1987) (dialogue) and Adhipan (1989) (screenplay). Jagadish's performance as Appukkuttan in In Harihar Nagar (1990), directed by Siddique-Lal, was highly acclaimed. Jagadish proved himself again with terrific comic timing with his role as Mayeen kutty in Godfather (1991), which was directed by the same director duo. He continued to play minor roles in high-budget films until 1993–1994. With the success of these movies, Jagadish became one of the most popular actors in the early to mid-1990s. He acted in the leading role in more than 30 low-budget films, most of which were successes at the box office. He acted in the family-oriented movies Sthree dhanam, Bharya, Ponnaranthottathe Rajavu, and Mr and Mrs. He also acted in the slapstick comedies Pavam IA Ivachan, and Kunukkitta Kozhi. In most movies he shared the hero role with the likes of Mukesh and Siddique. In his prime, he also acted in supporting roles with Mammootty, Mohanlal and Jayaram. The roles in Butterflies, Minnaminunginum Minnukettu and Jackpot earned loud applause from the audience.

In the late 1990s and 2000s, Jagadish failed to reinvent himself as a strong actor and continued doing the same kind of roles as his younger days which did not go well with the audience. Also, a new generation of comedy actors (including Dileep becoming his competitor as a hero in low-budget films, Kalabhavan Mani, Janardhanan and Kalpana turning to comedy roles, and Jagathy Sreekumar turning to a new type of comedy) was rising. He later appeared in stage shows conducted in foreign countries with his self-mocking stances and improvised dialogues.

Jagadish again got a break in his career in 2009 with his reappearance as "Appukkuttan" in Harihar Nagar 2, a sequel to In Harihar Nagar. The film went on to become a hit. This proved to be vital for Jagdish as he got another opportunity as the hero in another movie, Decent Parties. Jagadish was established as a comedian and light-hearted hero who evokes spontaneous laughter with a certain whimsical oddity; this was his humour quotient.

Later Jagadish played roles that distinguished him from his earlier stereotyped comedy roles, which has cost him dearly with the audience. In 2010 he scripted for the film April Fool, which was literally copied from Dinner for Schmucks, and the poor scripting resulted in failure. After a hiatus he came alive through television programs as a chief judge for the comedy programme Vodafone Comedy Stars in Asianet and anchored the channel's organized award functions. His policing changed the pattern of existing comedy through media into tight politically correct skits with light humour and morals. This screen presence brought him back more roles in big movies and his compatibility as a superstar both in front of the camera and on the TV stage was well praised by channels. He revealed in an interview as his fellow generation of actors were turning to production, he also is planning to direct a movie with Mammootty in the lead role.

In 2016, in Ranjith's movie Leela Jagadish played the negative role of a drunkard father which broke his stereotypical comedic roles and gathered wide appreciation.

Awards
Asianet Film Awards
 2009: Best Actor in a Comic Role – Harihar Nagar - II

Filmography

Actor

 My Dear Kuttichathan (1984)
 Odaruthammava Aalariyam (1984) as Kora
 Oru Naal Innorunaal (1985)
 Mutharamkunnu P.O. (1985) as Vasu 
 Akkare Ninnoru Maran (1985)
 Ponnum Kudathinu Pottu (1986) as College Student
 Mazha Peyunnu Madalam Kottunnu (1986) as Sub-Inspector of Police
 Love Story (1986) as Hameed
 Nandi Veendum Varika (1986)
 Veendum Lisa (1987)
 Irupatham Noottandu (1987)
 Bhoomiyile Rajakkanmar (1987)
 Sarvakalashala (1987) as Najeeb
 Ayitham (1987)
 Jaalakam (1987)
 Manivathurile Aayiram Sivarathrikal (1987)
 Sanghunadam (1988)
 Witness (1988) as Podiyan
 Vellanakalude Naadu (1988) as Kumaran 
 Samvalsarangal (1988)
 Oozham (1988)
 Sangham (1988)
 August 1 (1988)
 Oru Muthassi Katha (1988) as Thankappan
 Orkkappurathu  (1988) as Producer
 Chithram (1988)
 Varavelppu (1989)
 Vandanam (1989) as ASI Puroshotaman Nair
 Peruvannapurathe Visheshangal (1989)
 Kandathum Kettathum (1988) as Varghese
 News (1989)
 Kireedam (1989) as Suresh
 Vadakkunokkiyandram (1989)
 Pooram (1989)
 Swagatham (1989)
 Chanakyan (1989)
 Adikkurippu (1989)
 Shubhayathra (1990)
 Abhimanyu (1990) as Manikandon
 Aye Auto (1990)
 Thalayanamanthram (1990) as Bhasurachandran
 Minda Poochakku Kalyanam (1990)
 Pavam Pavam Rajakumaran (1990) as Sujanapalan
 Kadathanadan Ambadi (1990)
 Subhayathra (1990) as Rajendran
 Superstar (1990) as Kuttappan Thampuran
 Vidhyarambham (1990)
 Saandram (1990)
 Maalayogam (1990)
 In Harihar Nagar (1990) as Appukuttan
 His Highness Abdullah (1990)
 Gajakesariyogam (1990) as Parasuraman
 Ee Kannikoodi (1990)
 Dr. Pasupathy (1990)
 Akkare Akkare Akkare (1990) as Peter
 No.20 Madras Mail (1990) as Hari
 Kuttettan (1990)
 Sundhari Kakka (1991)
 Nayam Vyakthamakkunnu (1991) as Kurudimannil Sasi
 Mookilla Rajyathu (1991) as Police Inspector
 Post Box No. 27 (1991)
 Agninilavu (1991) as Sekharankutty
 Kalari (1991)
  Apoorvam Chilar (1991) as Subhramaniam
  Marathon (1991)
 Irrikku M.D. Akathudu (1991) as John
 Amina Tailors (1991) as Manjeri Majeed
 Parallel College (1991) as Vasu
 Nettippattam (1991) as Jocky
 Ennum Nanmakal (1991)
 Nagarathil Samsara Vishayam (1991) as Gopinatha Menon
 Kadinjool Kalyanam (1991) as Anthony D'Silva
 Mukha Chithram (1991)
 Mimics Parade (1991) as Unni
 Vishnulokam (1991)
 Kizhakkunarum Pakshi (1991)
 Koodikazhcha (1991) (actress Usha) as Skariya
 Godfather (1991) as Mayeenkutty
 Georgekutty C/O Georgekutty (1991)
 Ganamela (1991) as Mukundan
 Cheppukilukkana Changathi (1991)
 Kilukkam (1991)
 Abhimanyu (1991)
 Inspector Balram (1991)
 Welcome to Kodaikanal (1992) as James Kutty
 Thiruthalvaadi (1992)
 Thalastaanam (1992)
 Priyapetta Kukku (1992)
 Mr & Mrs (1992)
 Ponnaramthottathe Raajaavu (1992)
 Pandu Pandoru Rajakumari (1992) as Appukuttan Pillai
 Oru Kochu Bhoomikulukkam (1992)
 Mughamudra (1992)
 Manyanmaar (1992) as CI Vincent D'Souza
 Makkal Mahatmyam (1992) as Manikantan
 Mantrikacheppu (1992)
 Kunukkitta Kozhi (1992) as Unnikrishnan
 Ardram (1992)
 Kingini (1992)
 Kasarkode Khaderbai (1992) as Unni
 Kallan Kappalil Thanne (1992) as Appavi Appukuttan/Ananthan Gurukkal (double role)
 Grihapravesam (1992) as Kannan
 First Bell (1992)
 Congratulations Miss Anitha Menon (1992) as Police Inspector Rajan
 Addeham Enna Iddeham (1993) as Josy Perera
 Vakkeel Vasudev as (1993) Adv.Vasudev
 Uppukandam Brothers (1993)
 Sthreedhanam (1993)
 Sthalathe Pradhana Payyans (1993) as Gopalakrishnan
 Sakshal Sreeman Chathunni (1993)
 Sowbhagyam (1993) as Balachandran
 Narayam (1993)
 Journalist (1993) as Unnikrishnan
 Jackpot (1993)
 Janam (1993) as Harikrishnan
 Injakkadan Mathai & Sons (1993)
 Butterflies (1993)
 Palayam (1993)
 Vendor Daniel State Licency (1994)
 Bhagyavan (1994)
 Sainyam (1994)
 Santhanagopalam (1994)
 Pavam IA Ivachan (1994)
 Njan Kodiswaran (1994)
 Kudumba Visesham (1994)
 Pradakshinam (1994)
 [[Bharya (1994 film)|Bharya]] (1994)
 Chaithanyam (1995)
 Tom & Jerry (1995)
 Thakshashila (1995)
 Simhavalan Menon (1995)
 Prayikkara Pappan (1995)
 Nirnnayam (1995)
 Minnaminuginum Minnukettu (1995)
 Avittam Thirunaal Aarogya Sriman (1995)
 Maanthrikam (1995)
 Agnidevan (1995)
 Kireedamillatha Rajakkanmar (1996) as Shankar
 Kinnam Katta Kallan (1996) as Sub Inspector V.C. Bhagyanathan
 Kadhapurushan (1996)
 Kumkumacheppu (1996)
 Soorya Puthrikal (1996)
 Mimics Super 1000 (1996)
 Kalyana Sowgandhikam (1996)
 Kaliveedu (1996)
 Kaathil Oru Kinnaram (1996) as Hari
 Hitler (1996) as Hrudayabhanu
 Azhakiya Ravanan (1996)
 Superman (1997)
 Krishnagudiyil Oru Pranayakalathu (1997)
 My Dear Kuttichathan Part 2 (1997)
 Junior Mandrake (1997)
 Moonu Kodiyum Munnooru Pavanum (1997)
 Kilikurissiyile Kudumbamela (1997)
 Raajathanthram (1997)
 Nagarapuraanam (1997)
 Anubhoothi (1997)
 Ishtadanam (1997)
 Gajaraja Manthram (1997)
 Five Star Hospital (1997)
 Arjunan Pillayum Anchu Makkalum (1997) as Uthaman
 Ancharakalyanam (1997)
 Varnapakittu (1997) as Pylee
 Nakshatratharattu (1998)
 Malabar Ninnoru Manimaaran  (1998)
 British Market (1998)
 Sreekrishnapurathe Nakshathrathilakkam (1998)
 Sooryaputhran (1998)
 [[Sidhartha (1998 film)|Sidhartha]] (1998)
 Manthrikumaran (1998)
 Mangalya Pallakku (1998)
 Aalibabayum Aarara Kallanmarum (1998)
 Achamakuttiyude Achayan (1998)
 Kudumba Vaarthakal (1998)
 Harikrishnans (1998)
 Gramapanchayath (film) (1998)
 Ayal Kadha Ezhuthukayanu (1998)
 Ezhupunna Tharakan (1999) as Muhammad Ali
 Deepasthambham Mahascharyam (1999) as Susheelan
  Chandranudikkunna Dikhil (1999)
 Auto Brothers (1999)
 Pallavur Devanarayanan (1999)
 Swastham Grihabharanam (1999)
 Stalin Shivadas (1999) as Vishwam
 Aayiram Meni (1999)
 Aakasha Ganga (1999)
   Thennali Raman
 Sparsham (1999)
 Summer Palace (2000)
 Ee Mazha Then Mazha (2000)
 Sahayathrikakku Snehapoorvam (2000)
 Mimics 2000 (2000)
 India Gate (2000)
 Aanamuttathe Aangalamar (2000) as Rajeevan 
 Vinayapoorvam Vidhyaadharan (2000)
 Dreams (2000) as Servant
 The Gang (2000)
 The Warrant (2000) as Thomas Kora
 Devadoothan (2000)
 Sathyam Sivam Sundaram (2000)
 Ingane Oru Nilapakshi (2000) as Adiyodi
 Ennum Sambhavami Yuge Yuge (2001)
 Unnathangalil (2001) as Seban
 Mutholakottaram (2001)
 Bhadra (2001)
 Kakkakuyil (2001)
 Sharjah to Sharjah (2001)
 Ravanaprabhu (2001)
  House Owner (2001)
 Nariman (2001) as Gopi Pillai
 Bharthavudyogam (2001)
 Kakki Nakshatram (2002)Balan
 Thilakam (2002) as Venu
 Kalachakram (2002)
 Aabharanacharthu (2002)
  Grand Mother (2002)
 Nandanam (2002)
 Onnaaman (2002)
 Thandavam (2002)
 Oomappenninu Uriyadappayyan (2002)
 Jagathi Jagathish in Town (2002) as Unnikrishnan, Jagadish
 Puthooramputhri Unniyarcha (2002) as Kunjamarar
 Chirikkudukka (2002) as Sumukhan
 Chathurangam (2002)
 Videsi Nair Swadesi Nair (2002)
 Saudhamini (2003)
 [[The Fire (2003 film)|The Fire]] (2003) as Salim
 Vasanthamalika (2003) as Madhavan
 Thillana Thillana (2003)
 Sahodharan Sahadevan (2003) as Appukuttan
 Mr. Brahmachari (2003)
 War and Love (2003)
  Koodariyaathe (2003)
 Hariharan Pillai Happy Aanu (2003)
 Hungama (2003)— Hindi debut film
 Kottaram Vaidyan (2004)
 Chithrakoodam (2004) as Bhaskaran 
 Koottu (2004)
 Maniyarakkallan  (2004)
 Vamanapuram Bus Route (2004)
 Sethurama Iyer CBI (2004)
 KakkaKarumban (2004)
 Symphony (2004) as Manoharan
 [[Vellinakshatram (2004 film)|Vellinakshathram]] (2004)
 Jalolsavam (2004)
 Govindankutty Thirakkilanu (2004) as Thomaskutty
 Vettam (2004)
 Junior Senior (2005)
 Athbhutha Dweepu (2005)
 Chandrolsavam (2005) as Kuttiraman
 Kalyana Kurimanam (2005) as Madhavan
 Boyy Friennd (2005) as Vigneshwaran
 Baalyam (2006)
 Pakal (2006) as Ummachan
 Vasthavam (2006)
 Aanachandam (2006)
 Narakasuran (2006)
 Mahasamudram (2006)
 Balram vs. Tharadas (2006)
 Bhargavacharitham Moonam Khandam (2006)
 [[Black Cat (2007 film)|Black Cat]] (2007) as Vakkachan
 Ali Bhai as Kallankari Dasappan
 Kadha Parayumbol (2007)
 [[Paradesi (2007 film)|Paradesi]] (2007)
 Hallo (2007)
 Naalu Pennukal (2007)
 [[Flash (2007 film)|Flash]] (2007)
 Oru Pennum Randaanum (2008)
 Kaalchilambu (2008)
 Anthiponvettam (2008)
 Cycle (2008)
 [[One Way Ticket (2008 film)|One Way Ticket]] (2008)
 Sanmanassullavan Appukuttan (Vadakkan Sakhyam) (2008)
 Gulmohar (2008)
 Orkkuka Vellappozhum (2008)
 Twenty:20 (2008)
 Billu Barber  (2009) - Hindi film
 Samastha Keralam PO (2009)
 Kancheepurathe Kalyanam (2009)
 Decent Parties (2009)
 Paribhavam (2009)
 Red Chillies (2009)
 [[Seetha Kalyanam (2009 film)|Seetha Kalyanam]] (2009)
 Puthiya Mukham (2009)
 2 Harihar Nagar (2009) as Appukuttan
 Sanmanassullavan Appukuttan (2009) as Sugunan
 Kappal Muthalaali (2009) as Thulasidharan
 Pazhassi Raja (2009)
 Senior Mandrake (2010)
 In Ghost House Inn (2010) as Appukuttan
 [[April Fool (2010 film)|April Fool]] (2010)
 Cheriya Kallanum Valiya Policum (2010) as K P Kumaran
 Advocate Lakshmanan – Ladies Only (2010)
 Paattinte Palazhy (2010)
 Karayilekku Oru Kadal Dooram (2010)
  Sakurumbam Shyamala (2010)
 Sarkar Colony (2010)
 Fiddle (2010)
 Thoovalkattu (2010)
 Vandae Maatharam (2010) Bilingual film
 [[Alexander the Great (2010 film)|Alexander the Great]] (2010) 
 T. D. Dasan Std. VI B (2010)
 Again Kasargod Khader Bhai (2010)
 Makeup Man (2011)
 Nadakame Ulakam (2011)
 Ithu Nammude Katha (2011)
 City of God (2011)
 Manikyakkallu (2011)
 Kottarathil Kutty Bhootham (2011)
 Female Unnikrishnan (2011)
 Lucky Jokers (2011)
 Uppukandam Brothers Back in Action as Josekutty/Joy 
 Theja Bhai and Family (2011) as Govindan Nair
 Bombay Mittayi (2012)
 Red Alert (2012) 
 Kochi (2012) as Vishwanathan
 No. 66 Madhura Bus (2012)
  Pulival Pattanam (2012)
  Bombay Mittayi (2012)
 Kunjaliyan (2012) as Sukumaran
 Achante Aanmakkal (2012) as Nandagopan
 Ozhimuri (2012) as Madhupal
 Players (Two Wheeler) (Hai Rose) (2013)
 Pakaram (2013)
 White Paper (2013)
 Rose Guitarinaal (2013)
 Lisammayude Veedu (2013)
 Left Right Left (2013)
 One Day Jokes (2014)
 One (2013)
 At Once (2013)
 Kadal Kadannu Oru Mathukkutty (2013) as Himself
 Ginger (2013) as Sethumadhavan 
 Malayala Nadu (2013)
 Mazhayariyaathe (2014)
 Parankimala (2014)
 On The Way (2014)
 Color Balloon (2014)
 Maayaapuri 3D (2014)
 Education Loan (2014)
 Christmas Cake (2014)
 Nayana (2014)
 Rasam (2015)
 Buddhan Chirikkunnu (2015)
 White paper (2015)
 Gamer (2015)
 John Honai (2015)
 Two Countries (2015)
 Leela (2016)
 Kasaba (2016)
 Karinkunnam 6'S (2016)
 C/O Saira Banu (2017)
 Shirk (2018)
 Swapnarajyam (2019)
 Aakasha Ganga 2 (2019) ( photo archive) One (2021)The Priest (2021)
 Bhramam (2021)
 Madhuram (2021)
 Bro Daddy (2022)
 Pada (2022)Thatukadda muthal cemetery varee (2022) 
 Head Master (2022)
 Khali purse of billionaires (2022)
  Gold(2022)
 Veekam (2022)
 Marathakam (2022)
 Kaapa (2022)Rorschach (2022) as Ashraf
 Mukundan Unni Associates (2022) as Judge
 Ayalvaashi (2023)

Writer
 Mutharamkunnu P.O. (1985) (story)
 Akkare Ninnoru Maran (1985) (story)
 Mazha Peyyunnu Maddalam Kottunnu (1986) (story)
 Ponnukudathinu Pottu (1986) (story)
 Nandi Veendum Varika (1986) (story)
 Manivatharile Aayiram Sivarathrikal (1987) (dialogue)
 Oru Muthassi Katha (1988) (story)
 News (1989) (screenplay and dialogue)
 Adhipan (1989) (screenplay and dialogue)
 Minda Poochakku Kalyanam (1990) (screenplay and dialogue)
 Ganamela (1991) (story and screenplay)
 April Fool'' (2010) (screenplay and dialogue)

Dubbing artist

Playback singer

Television career

References

External links
 
Jagadeesh at MSI

Indian male film actors
Male actors from Thiruvananthapuram
1955 births
Living people
Male actors in Malayalam cinema
Indian National Congress politicians from Kerala
Indian academics
Kerala politicians
Male actors in Malayalam television
Indian male television actors
Indian actor-politicians
20th-century Indian male actors
21st-century Indian politicians
21st-century Indian male actors
Malayalam comedians
Indian male comedians
Politicians from Thiruvananthapuram
Malayalam screenwriters
20th-century Indian dramatists and playwrights
21st-century Indian dramatists and playwrights
Screenwriters from Thiruvananthapuram
Singers from Thiruvananthapuram
Malayalam playback singers
Indian male playback singers
Male actors in Hindi television